Avenir Telecom is a telecommunication products' distributor and related services' provider. It is one of the leading companies in the European market. The major shareholder is the holding company OXO.

The Company has worldwide operations. They consist in the distribution and sale of a wide variety of communication products, especially mobile phones, activation of service, accessories, answering and fax machines, phone cases, phone chargers, phone soxs, plastic shelves, 3D phone stickers for mobiles and laptops, earkits, hands-free kits, portable headsets, and USB Bluetooth dongles under the OXO name.

History

Avenir Telecom was founded in 1989 in Marseille, France, by Jean-Daniel Beurnier. At first, it was centered on selling analog mobile phones regionally, before it gained ground in the French national market. In 1992, it signed its first distribution agreement with SFR, and extended it to GSM2 services in 1992. In 1994, the company also sealed  an agreement with Itineris and accelerated its growth.

In 1995, the company created its own line of telephone accessories (branded as Top Suxess) and diversified its operations by creating the after sale services' provider Setelec (1995), the logistic management company Logistis (1998) and the internet services' company Net-Up (1998).

In 1997, it also started expanding its retail network, creating Phone Shop and Mobile Hut and purchasing the retail chain Interdiscount. In 1999, it sold Phone Shop to the Cegetel Group. At the same time, Avenir Telecom was developing its international business, gaining ground in Europe and Asia.

Operations
The company has more than 671 retail locations for the Internity brand. It also distributes through hypermarkets, supermarkets, specialist chains, and independent retailers, as well as operates a network of independent multi-operator retailers in France, with 100 points of sale franchised under the Mobile Hut brand.

Shareholders' structure
Public:  48.2%
Oxo:  29.9%
Jean-Daniel Beurnier:  20.5%
Managers:  0.5%

Notes

References

Companies based in Marseille
Mobile phone companies of France
Retail companies of France
French brands
Companies listed on Euronext Paris